Falonte Moore, also known as "Fonz", is an American singer, songwriter, and producer, best known for co-writing Destiny's Child's "Bootylicious". Moore began his career as one part of R&B/Neo-Soul duo Koffee Brown, releasing 2001 project Mars/Venus signed to Arista Records. The group quickly disbanded after the release of their album, and Moore moved into songwriting and production for other artists, frequently working alongside producer Rob Fusari.

Songwriting and production credits

Credits are courtesy of Discogs, Genius, Apple Music, and AllMusic.

Awards and nominations

References 

Living people
African-American songwriters
American hip hop record producers
African-American record producers
Year of birth missing (living people)